Pompei College located in at Aikala near Kinnigoli town, within India's  Karnataka state, was founded by Rev. Fr.Bernard L. D’Souza in 1981. It is affiliated with Mangalore University.
The College offers pre-university courses in science, commerce and arts. It also has primary school  and high school.

Courses
 B.A.
 B.Com
 BBM
 M.Com

References

http://portal.kinnigoli.com/index.php?option=com_content&view=article&id=4429:teachersday-pompei-college-aikala&catid=18:varado-special-events&Itemid=33
http://www.daijiworld.com/news/news_disp.asp?n_id=180825
http://www.bellevision.com/belle/index.php?action=topnews&type=4772

Universities and colleges in Mangalore
1981 establishments in Karnataka
Educational institutions established in 1981